Laila Khan is a Pakistani Pashtun playback singer. Amongst contemporary artists, she is considered one of the proponents of Pashto music. Her role was further demonstrated for singing a fusion song in five languages – Pashto, Urdu, French, English and Arabic – apart from performing in Pashto.

Early life and career 
She started her career in 2013. She produced most of her work in the Pashto language. Her other compositions include Arabic and Urdu poetry. She has primarily worked with Latoon Productions.

She made her singing debut with Za Laila Yama song. In 2015, she produced prominent songs titled Khabara Da Pakhtu Da and Dheere Dheere Se Meri Zindagi May Aana which were recorded for the Pakistan Super League cricket team Peshawar Zalmi). She has also worked in the Pollywood film industry.

In January 2015, she was one of the singers for the song Amann, written by Laiq Zada Laiq in memoriam to those who lost their lives in the 2014 Peshawar school massacre. As of May 2016, Khan was working with Latoon Productions' owner Fawad Khan on completing her latest Pashto album, focused on the students of Army Public School Peshawar and to all those who perished in the 2014 Peshawar school massacre. Two songs from this album have already been released.

In 2016, Khan was the chosen representative from Pakistan to perform at multiple international concerts in Tunisia, along with other global singers. Khan's participation in Tunisia's musical concerts was reportedly focused on "promoting peace in a region affected by militant insurgency which started five years ago". She is also known for a fusion song, which she performed in five languages such as Pashto, Urdu, French, English, and Arabic. As of May 2016, she has performed in five concerts, with reports of 25 additional concerts being planned.

References

External links 
 
 
 

Living people
Pashtun women
Pashto-language singers
Pakistani pop singers
1997 births
21st-century Pakistani women singers